The Shocknife is a composite training knife for law enforcement, corrections and military personnel equipped with a battery pack to generate an electric shock. It was invented by Canadian Police Officer Jeff Quail.

The Shocknife is notable for the electrical shock it delivers when used in a knife strike. The electrical shock stimulates the nerve fibers in the same way a real knife cut would but without causing injury. This is intended to simulate the pain that would be inflicted by a real cut and to induce similar responses, such as the fight or flight response.  The Shocknife is in use by law enforcement agencies and military training programs worldwide.

Footnotes

External links 
Official Site
28 July 2006 review (see 13 August 2006 archive) at Officer.com

Knives